Haemaphysalis leachi, the yellow dog tick, is a hard-bodied tick of the genus Haemaphysalis. It is also known as African dog tick, or simply as dog tick in many parts of the world.

Distribution
It is rather cosmopolitan species found throughout Angola, Benin, Botswana, Burkina Faso, Burundi, Cameroon, Republic of Congo, Democratic Republic of Congo, Cote D'Ivoire, Eswatini, Ethiopia, Gabon, Gambia, Ghana, Guinea, Guinea-Bissau, India, Indonesia, Kenya, Lesotho, Liberia, Libya, Malawi, Mali, Mauritania, Mozambique, Namibia, Nigeria, Pakistan, Rwanda, Senegal, Sierra Leone, Somalia, South Africa, Sri Lanka, Sudan, Tanzania, Togo, Tunisia, Uganda, Zambia, Zimbabwe.

Parasitism
It is an obligate ectoparasite of many wild and domestic mammals such as domestic and wild carnivores, small rodents, and cattle. It is also a potential vector of boutonneuse fever and canine babesiosis.

Lifecycle
In yellow dog tick lifecycle, it is attached in to three hosts to complete its life cycle. When the host such as a dog starts to scratch, female dog tick starts to produce a dog-repelling allomone, which enable tick to survive on the hosts further time.

References

External links
Semiochemicals of Haemaphysalis leachi, the Yellow dog tick
Effect of Water Flooding on the Oviposition Capacity of Engorged Adult Females and Hatchability of Eggs of Dog Ticks: Rhipicephalus sanguineus and Haemaphysalis leachi leachi
Studies on the bionomics and biophysiological constituents of Haemaphysalis leachi leachi (dog tick) in Nigeria 1986
A rickettsial disease in East Africa transmitted by ticks (Rhipicephalus simus and Haemaphysalis leachi)

Ticks
Ixodidae
Animals described in 1826